David "Dave" J. Kappos (born March 3, 1961) is an attorney and former government official who served as Under Secretary of Commerce for Intellectual Property and Director of the United States Patent and Trademark Office (USPTO) from 2009 to 2013. Kappos is currently a partner at New York law firm Cravath, Swaine & Moore.

Prior to being confirmed to the post by the U.S. Senate on August 7, 2009,  Kappos was the vice president and assistant general counsel, intellectual property law, for IBM Corporation. Kappos announced his intent to step down from the position in late January 2013.  His final day in office was February 1, 2013. He was succeeded by Teresa Stanek Rea as Acting Under Secretary and Acting Director.

Early life and education 
Kappos was born March 3, 1961, in Palos Verdes, California. He is the grandson of immigrants from Greece. Kappos received his Bachelor of Science in electrical and computer engineering from the University of California-Davis in 1983, and his Juris Doctor degree from the University of California, Berkeley in 1990.

Career

IBM career 
He joined IBM in 1983 as a development engineer and has served in a variety of roles before taking his last position at IBM, including intellectual property law attorney in IBM's Storage Division and Litigation group, IP Law Counsel in IBM's Software Group, assistant general counsel for IBM Asia/Pacific, IBM Corporate Counsel and assistant general counsel.

USPTO tenure 
Kappos became Under Secretary of Commerce for Intellectual Property and USPTO Director in August 2009. In this capacity, he was a chief negotiator in the passage and implementation of the Leahy-Smith America Invents Act; signed into law by President Barack Obama in September 2011. The legislation  represents the most significant legislative change to the U.S. patent system since the Patent Act of 1952.

During his tenure, the USPTO's backlog dropped from over 770,000 to under 668,500 between 2009 and 2012. In November 2012, it was reported that Kappos intended to retire from the role in 2013, and he left office on February 1, 2013.

Post-USPTO career 
After leaving the USPTO, Kappos joined the law firm of Cravath, Swaine & Moore, where he advises clients on intellectual property matters relating to corporate mergers and acquisitions, litigation and fintech. He is also an adjunct professor of copyright litigation at Columbia Law School, and of legal advising for start up general counsel at Cornell Law School.

Recognition 
In 2016, he was named one of the “Top 25 Icons of IP” by Law360. In 2014, he was listed as one of The National Law Journal'''s inaugural “Top 50 Intellectual Property Trailblazers & Pioneers”. Kappos was inducted into the Intellectual Property Hall of Fame by Intellectual Asset Management magazine in 2012. He serves on the boards of directors of the Partnership for Public Service, the Center for Global Enterprise and the Intellectual Property Owners Education Foundation. Kappos is also the chair of the Advisory Council of the Naples Roundtable and the chair of the U.S.-China IP Cooperation Dialogue.
 References 

 Further reading and listening 
 Rick Merritt, IBM exec picked to head patent office, EE Times, June 18, 2009.
 Dennis Crouch, David Kappos: Next USPTO Director, Patently-O blog, June 18, 2009.
 Mr. David Kappos, Biography (UNC Symposium for Intellectual Property, Creativity, and the Innovation Process)
 William New, USPTO Nominee Kappos Appears To Clear First Senate Hurdle, Intellectual Property Watch, 29 July 2009 
 United States Senate Committee on the Judiciary, Hearing of David J. Kappos, July 29, 2009.

 Timothy B. Lee, US patent chief to software patent critics: "Give it a rest already", Ars Technica'', Journalism, November 20, 2012

External links

 David J. Kappos biography at Cravath, Swaine & Moore
  David Kappos Senate confirmation proceedings.
  Transcript, David Kappos Senate confirmation hearing.

1961 births
Living people
Under Secretaries of Commerce for Intellectual Property
IBM employees
University of California, Davis alumni
UC Berkeley School of Law alumni
American patent attorneys
People from Palos Verdes, California
Cravath, Swaine & Moore people
American people of Greek descent